Eve's Lover is a 1925 American silent drama film directed by Roy Del Ruth and starring Irene Rich, Bert Lytell, and Clara Bow. The screenplay was by Darryl F. Zanuck from a story by Mrs. W. K. Clifford in Eve's Lover, and Other Stories (c. 1924). Warner Bros. produced and distributed the film.

Cast

Preservation
With no prints of Eve's Lover located in any film archives, it is a lost film.

References

External links

Eve's Lover at IMDb.com

1925 films
American silent feature films
Films directed by Roy Del Ruth
Lost American films
Warner Bros. films
Films based on short fiction
American black-and-white films
Silent American drama films
1925 drama films
1925 lost films
Lost drama films
1920s American films
1920s English-language films